Viennese Girls (German: Wiener Mädeln) is a 1945 historical musical film directed by Willi Forst and starring Forst, Anton Edthofer and Judith Holzmeister. The film was made by Wien-Film, a Vienna-based company set up after Austria had been incorporated into Greater Germany following the 1938 Anschluss. It was the third film in Forst's "Viennese Trilogy" which also included Operetta (1940) and Vienna Blood (1942). The film was finished in 1945, during the closing days of the Second World War. This led to severe delays in its release, which eventually took place in 1949 in two separate versions. One was released by the Soviet-backed Sovexport in the Eastern Bloc and the other by Forst.

Plot
The composer Carl Michael Ziehrer produces twenty two operettas during his career, although he is overshadowed by the more successful Strauss Family (Johann Strauss I and his son Johann Strauss II).

Cast

See also
Überläufer

References

External links

Wiener Mädeln Full movie with English subtitles at Deutsche Filmothek

Films of Nazi Germany
East German films
German biographical films
Austrian biographical films
1940s biographical films
Operetta films
Films set in Vienna
Films set in the 19th century
Films directed by Willi Forst
Films about classical music and musicians
Films about composers
Wiener Film
Cultural depictions of Johann Strauss II
Austrian historical musical films
German historical musical films
1940s historical musical films
1940s German-language films